The Department of Public Safety is a cabinet level agency in the executive branch of Arkansas state government responsible for state law enforcement, emergency management, crime information, crime support, and fire safety. It was created in 2019. The Department of Public Safety is headquartered at One State Police Plaza Drive in Little Rock, Arkansas.

History

The Arkansas Transformation and Efficiencies Act of 2019 is considered a signature piece of legislation under Governor Asa Hutchinson . Prior to the Act 910 of 2019, the State of Arkansas had 42 cabinet-level agencies reporting directly to the Governor of Arkansas. Act 910 of 2019 reduced the number or cabinet-level agencies to 15, including the Department of Public Safety. This change is considered the largest reorganization in Arkansas State Government in the past 50 years.

The Secretary of the Arkansas Department of Public Safety is the executive head of the department, appointed by the Governor, is subject to confirmation by the Arkansas Senate, and serves at the pleasure of the Governor.

Each board and division of the Arkansas Department of Public Safety is under the direction, control, and supervision of the Secretary of the Department. Though, the Secretary of the Department can delegate functions, powers, and duties to the boards and divisions under the Arkansas Department of Public Safety.

Boards and Divisions

The Arkansas Department of Public Safety is divided into boards and divisions:

Law Enforcement
 Arkansas Commission on Law Enforcement Standards and Training  
  Arkansas State Police Division 

Emergency Management
 Arkansas Division of Emergency Management  

Crime Information and Support
 Arkansas Crime Information Center 
 Arkansas State Crime Laboratory 
 Crime Victims Reparations Board  

Fire Safety
 Fire Safety  
 Fire Prevention Commission

External links
  Arkansas Department of Public Safety Website

References

1935 establishments in Arkansas
Executive branch of the government of Arkansas
Government agencies established in 1935
Organizations based in Little Rock, Arkansas
Safety organizations
State law enforcement agencies of Arkansas